South Carolina Highway 57 (SC 57) is a  state highway in the northeastern part of the U.S. state of South Carolina. The highway travels in a southeast-northwest orientation from the unincorporated community of Fork northwest through Dillon to Little Rock and then curves northeasterly to the North Carolina state line, north of Little Rock, all completely within Dillon County.

Route description
SC 57 begins at an intersection with SC 41 and SC 41 Alternate in Fork. The route heads northeast through the town of Floydale until it enters Dillon. In town, the highway intersects SC 9, and the two routes form a concurrency to the northwest. They run along East Main Street until they meet U.S. Route 301 (US 301), US 501, and SC 34. SC 9/SC 57 turn right onto US 301/US 501 (North 2nd Avenue) slightly to the northeast. At Julia Lane, they split off from the concurrency to the northwest. They have an interchange with Interstate 95 (I-95) just before leaving the city. At the northern part of Little Rock, SC 57 departs the concurrency curving to the northeast until it meets its northern terminus, the North Carolina state line north of Little Rock. Here, the roadway continues as Fairley Road northeast to Raemon.

SC 57 is not part of the National Highway System, a system of roadways important to the nation's economy, defense, and mobility.

History

South Carolina Highway 95

South Carolina Highway 95 (SC 95) was a state highway that existed in the far northern part of Dillon County. The next year, it was extended north-northwest and north-northeast to the North Carolina state line, where it continued as Fairley Road. In September 1951, it was decommissioned; most of its path was redesignated as SC 57.

Major intersections

See also

References

External links

 
SC 57 at the South Carolina Hwy Index

057
Transportation in Dillon County, South Carolina